Trezzvant William Anderson (November 22, 1906 – March 25, 1963) was an American journalist, publicist, and war correspondent.

Life and career
Anderson was born in Charlotte, North Carolina, and attended the city's Johnson C. Smith College, but left before his graduation. While at college he served as features editor of the college's newspaper, The University Student.

In the 1930s Anderson worked as a publicist for the singer Billy Eckstine, who was then at the start of his career.

Anderson wrote the book Come Out Fighting: The Epic Tale of the 761st Tank Battalion, 1942-1945 (1945) about the United States Army's 761st Tank Battalion exploits during the war. The battalion was made up of primarily African-American soldiers. The battalion received a Presidential Unit Citation and several individuals in the battalion won awards for their heroism.

In 1947 Anderson joined the Pittsburgh Courier, and after initially working in Pittsburgh, became "The Courier Roving Reporter" in 1957, covering the nascent civil rights movement in the Southern states. Anderson died in Macon, Georgia, in 1963.

External links

References

1906 births
1963 deaths
African-American journalists
American male journalists
United States Army personnel of World War II
American public relations people
United States Army soldiers
American war correspondents of World War II
Historians of World War II
Writers from Charlotte, North Carolina
Johnson C. Smith University alumni